Hyperolius tanneri is a species of frogs in the family Hyperoliidae. It is endemic to the West Usambara Mountains in northeastern Tanzania. Common name Tanner's reed frog has been coined for this species.

Etymology
The specific name tanneri honours John and Lucie Tanner, owners of a tea estate in Mazumbai (the type locality) and noted for welcoming visiting zoologist. In this case, the plural form tannerorum would have been technically correct, and in his later work , the scientist who described the species in 1982, amended the spelling accordingly. However, this is considered "unjustified emendation", and the correct name of the species follows the original spelling.

Description
Males measure  and females  in snout–vent length. In addition to sexual size dimorphism, males differ from females by having rather large, smooth gular flap. The dorsum is green and has light canthal and dorsolateral stripes. The fingers and toes are yellow, and the throat and ventrum are blue-green.

Hyperolius tanneri resembles Hyperolius spinigularis, but lacks the black spines on the throat and ventrum of the latter.

Habitat and conservation
Its natural habitats are undisturbed montane forests. The only known breeding site is a small forest swamp that is bordering a small stream in Mazumbai (suitable swamp also exists in Shume-Magambo).

This species is believed to be decreasing because of habitat loss, caused by agricultural expansion, logging and expanding human settlements. While it occurs in or near protected areas, additional habitat protection would be needed. Because the species is only known from two sites in one location suffering from habitat loss, it has been assessed as "Critically Endangered" by the International Union for Conservation of Nature (IUCN).

References

tanneri
Frogs of Africa
Amphibians of Tanzania
Endemic fauna of Tanzania
Amphibians described in 1982
Taxa named by Arne Schiøtz
Taxonomy articles created by Polbot